This is a list of bridges and viaducts in South Korea, including those for pedestrians and vehicular traffic.

Historical and architectural interest bridges

Major road and railway bridges 
This table presents the structures with spans greater than 200 meters (non-exhaustive list).

Han River bridges in Seoul 
This list present all bridges from the mouth of the Han River to the end of Seoul Special City.

Notes and references 
 Notes

 "National Treasure of South Korea". heritage.go.kr (in Korean).

 

 

 Others references

See also 

 Transport in South Korea
 Rail transport in South Korea
 Highway system in South Korea
 Geography of South Korea
 Korean architecture

External links 

 
 
 
 
 
 
 

South Korea
 
Bridges
Bridges